The following list is a discography of production by DJ Toomp, an American hip hop record producer from Atlanta, Georgia. It includes a list of songs produced, co-produced and remixed by year, artist, album and title.

Singles

1988

MC Shy D - Comin' Correct in 88
01. "I Am Rough" (produced with MC Shy D & Mike Fresh)
02. "It's Just My Caddy" (produced with MC Shy D & Mike Fresh) 
03. "I Don't Want To Treat You Wrong" (produced with MC Shy D & Mike Fresh)  
04. "I Don't Play" (produced with MC Shy D & Mike Fresh) 
05. "I Will Go Off Part II" (produced with MC Shy D & Mike Fresh)
06. "Atlanta That's Where I Stay" (produced with MC Shy D & Mike Fresh) 
07. "Shake It" (produced with MC Shy D & Mike Fresh)  
08. "I Wanna Dance" (produced with MC Shy D & Mike Fresh)
09. "Tearin' It Up" (produced with MC Shy D & Mike Fresh)

1990

MC Shy D - Don't Sweat Me
01. "I Am Back" (produced with MC Shy D & Michael Sterling)
02. "Don't Sweat Me" (produced by MC Shy D & Mike Fresh & Michael Sterling) 
03. "Got It Good" (produced with MC Shy D & Michael Sterling)  
04. "You Are Everything" (produced with MC Shy D & Michael Sterling) 
05. "Groove" (produced with MC Shy D & Michael Sterling)
06. "What's All This About" (produced with MC Shy D & Michael Sterling) 
07. "I Can Make You Dance" (produced with MC Shy D & Michael Sterling)  
08. "Work It" (produced with MC Shy D & Michael Sterling)
09. "G.T.F.O.M.F.B." (produced with MC Shy D & Michael Sterling)

1993

Parental Advisory (P.A.)- Ghetto Street Funk 
06. "3 B"

1994

Native Nuttz - The Nativez Are Restless 
01. "Rock Rock On"  
02. "40 Oz. (Remix)"    
03. "Skinflower"    
04. "Pazz Tha Puddin'" 
05. "Fruit N Slide"    
06. "All N Da Splendor"   
07. "Native Luzt"    
08. "Give A (Shout)"    
09. "Pissin' On Tha Wallz Of Damnation"    
10. "Erect From Tha Slumz"    
11. "40 Oz. (Original)"

1997

Lil Jon & the East Side Boyz - Get Crunk, Who U Wit: Da Album
09. "Shawty Freak A Lil Sumtin'"
10. "Giddy Up Let's Ride - Giddy Up Let's Ride Outro"
13. "Cut Up"

1999

Jim Crow - Crow's Nest 
02. "Bandits"

2001

T.I. - I'm Serious 
01. "Intro"
03. "Dope Boyz"
06. "Why I'm Serious (Interlude)"
08. "Do It"
15. "Heavy Chevys"
17. "Outro"

2003

T.I. - Trap Muzik 
"Trap Muzik" (co produced by San "Chez" Holmes and T.I.)
"Be Easy"
"24's"
"Look What I Got"
"Bezzle"

2004

Kavious - Murder Dog - Celebrating 10 Years 
"Where You From"

Ludacris - The Red Light District 
14. "Two Miles an Hour"

T.I. - Urban Legend 
02. "Motivation"
03. "U Don't Know Me"

Pastor Troy - By Any Means Necessary 
03. "Ridin Big"

2005

Benzino - Arch Nemesis
10. "What's Really Good" (featuring Scarface & Young Hardy)

Boyz n da Hood - Boyz n da Hood
07. "Don't Put Your Hands On Me"

Disturbing tha Peace - Disturbing tha Peace 
12. "Two Miles an Hour (Remix)" (performed by Ludacris & Playaz Circle)

2006

Da BackWudz - Wood Work 
04. "Gettin' 2 It" (featuring Killer Mike)

Pitbull - El Mariel 
03. "Come See Me"

T.I. - King 
03. "What You Know" (co-produced by Wonder)
18. "Bankhead" (featuring P$C & Young Dro)

Rick Ross - Port of Miami 
12. "White House"

Turk - Still a Hot Boy 
01. "Live from the Lab" (featuring Ke'Noe)
02. "Get It How I Live" (featuring Ke'Noe & S.S.)
05. "I Ain't Never Heard" (featuring Chamillionaire, Ke'Noe & S.S.) (co-produced by Ke'Noe)
06. "Calling Out" (featuring Bun B & S.S.)
07. "Life is a Gamble 2 (Remix)"

Ludacris - Release Therapy 
06. "Mouths to Feed"

Young Jeezy - The Inspiration 
05. "I Luv It"
15. "I Got Money" (featuring T.I.)

2007

Jay-Z - American Gangster 
11. "Say Hello"

8Ball & MJG - Ridin High 
15. "Worldwide"

Young Buck - Buck the World 
09. "Pocket Full of Paper"

Bone Thugs-N-Harmony - Strength & Loyalty 
13. "Sounds The Same"

Twisted Black - Street Fame 
12. "I'm a Fool Wit It"

Kanye West - Graduation 
05. "Good Life" (featuring T-Pain, co-produced by Kanye West)
06. "Can't Tell Me Nothing" (co-produced by Kanye West)
13. "Big Brother"

2008

Mariah Carey - E=MC² 
08. "I'll Be Lovin' U Long Time"

Rick Ross - Trilla 
09. "This Me"

Nas - Untitled 
09. "N.I.G.G.E.R. (The Slave and the Master)"
Leftover
00. "Queens Wolf"

The Game - LAX 
10. "House of Pain"

Young Jeezy - The Recession 
01. "The Recession (Intro)"

Ludacris - Theater of the Mind 
03. "Wish You Would" (featuring T.I.)

T.I. - Paper Trail 
01. "56 Barz"
12. "Every Chance I Get"

San Quinn - From a Boy to a Man 
00. "Bring Game To The Table

2009

Rick Ross - Deeper Than Rap 
13. "Valley of Death" (co-produced by Khao)

2010

Game - The Red Room 
06. "Never Stop Hustlin" (featuring Fabolous) (produced with Rico Law)

Kanye West - My Beautiful Dark Twisted Fantasy 
 12. "Blame Game" (featuring John Legend & Chris Rock) (co-produced by Kanye West)

T.I. - Fuck a Mixtape 
06. "Yeah Ya Know (Takers)"
13. "Really Living Like That"
13. "Got Your Back" (featuring Keri Hilson) (Bonus Track)

Rick Ross - The Albert Anastasia EP 
13. "Nasty"

T.I. - No Mercy 
07. "Big Picture"

Game - Brake Lights 
11. "Phantom of the Opera" (featuring Robin Thicke)

2011

Glasses Malone - Beach Cruiser 
04. "Certified" (featuring Akon)

Wale - The Eleven One Eleven Theory 
07. "Barry Sanders"

Wale - Ambition 
04. "Legendary"
13. "No Days Off"

Alley Boy - Definition of Fuck Shit Pt. 2
12. "For Certain"

Lil Eazy-E - Prince of Compton
01. "What We're Claiming"

2012

T.I. - F*ck da City Up 
11. "Who What When" (featuring Meek Mill & Yung Booke)

Pitbull - Original Hits
11. "Come See Me"

DJ Khaled - Kiss the Ring
12. "Outro (They Don't Want War)" (featuring Ace Hood)

T.I. - Trouble Man: Heavy Is the Head 
03. "Trap Back Jumpin'"
14. "Who Want Some"

Curren$y - Priest Andretti 
02. "Money Machine Pt. 2"

Rocko - Wordplay
11. "Oddz"

2013

Curren$y - New Jet City 
13. "Drive" (featuring Styles P & Young Roddy)

2 Chainz - B.O.A.T.S. II: Me Time 
13. "Black Unicorn" (featuring Chrisette Michele & Sunni Patterson)

2014

T.I. - Paperwork
13. "On Doe, On Phil" 
Leftover
00. "Turn It"

Rick Ross - Hood Billionaire
08. "Elvis Presley Blvd." 
11. "Quintessential"

2019

Nas - The Lost Tapes II
12. "Queens Wolf"

References

External links
 
 
 DJ Toomp Bio info at http://www.musicpowers.com/djtoomp/ 

Production discographies
Hip hop discographies
 
 
Discographies of American artists